The 2006 Mid-Continent Conference men's basketball tournament took place between Saturday, March 4, 2006 and Tuesday, March 7, 2006 at the John Q. Hammons Arena in Tulsa, Oklahoma.

Bracket

See also
 Summit League men's basketball tournament

References

2005–06 Mid-Continent Conference men's basketball season
Summit League men's basketball tournament
Basketball competitions in Tulsa, Oklahoma
2006 in sports in Oklahoma